Angu Motzfeldt (born 1976) is a Greenlandic singer In 2002, his music appeared on the soundtrack to Inuk Silis Høegh's prize-winning film Eskimo Weekend. He appeared on the Danish TV series Forsvar as well. He also works in Greenland's Securitas company.

References

External links 

Greenlandic male actors
Greenlandic male singers
Inuit musicians
English-language singers from Greenland
Living people
1976 births
21st-century Danish male  singers